Framnäsviken is the name of a small bay of Stora Värtan in Djursholm between the neighbourhoods Germania and Svalnäs.

Until 1976 there was a railway stop here called Djursholms Framnäsviken ("Framnäsviken of Djursholm") at the eastern Djursholmsbanan, a part of Roslagsbanan which was closed that year. Station code: Djf. Originally, this railway stop was the northern end station and goods were reloaded between railway and ship transport here, Framnäsviken at the time being a commercial harbour. The bridge and the old railway bank is now used for pedestrians and bicycles and for skiing in the winter time.

References

Metropolitan Stockholm
Railway stations closed in 1976
Disused railway stations in Sweden